Époisses, also known as Époisses de Bourgogne, is a legally demarcated cheese made in the village of Époisses and its environs, in the département of Côte-d'Or, about halfway between Dijon and Auxerre, in the former duchy of Burgundy, France, from agricultural processes and resources traditionally found in that region.

Époisses is a pungent soft-paste cow's-milk cheese. It is made either from raw or pasteurized milk. It is sold in a circular wooden box and, in restaurants, is sometimes served with a spoon due to its extremely soft texture. The cheese is often paired with Trappist beer or even Sauternes rather than a red wine.

History

At the start of the sixteenth century, the village was home to a community of Cistercians at Cîteaux Abbey that, according to oral legend, began production of the cheese. Two hundred years later, when the community left, local farmers inherited the recipe, which developed over the next century.  Napoleon was particularly fond of the cheese, and the famous epicure Jean Anthelme Brillat-Savarin classed it as the "king of all cheeses".

Although popular at the start of the twentieth century, with over 300 farms manufacturing the cheese, production had all but died out by the end of the Second World War. This resulted from the loss of a significant portion of the male population, leaving the women to work the fields, which in turn led to the neglect of the local dairy businesses and cheese-making.

In 1956 a pair of small farmers, Robert and Simone Berthaut, decided to re-launch the production of Époisses by mobilizing the traditional skills of those who still knew how to make the cheese.  Berthaut Époisses increasingly gained favor among its devotees and became a spectacular success.  The business is now carried on by their son, Jean Berthaut.  Fromagerie Berthaut is currently responsible for the manufacture of all fermier Époisses, although several artisanal fromageries now manufacture the cheese.

Manufacture

The fragile curds are drained in moulds, and the whey is then allowed to run off. Around 48 hours later the cheese is removed, salted, and placed on racks to dry; once dry, it is moved to cellars to mature.

Each cheese is rinsed up to three times per week in a mixture of water and marc, and brushed by hand to spread the bacteria evenly over the surface. The yeast and fermenting agents produce the distinctive orange-red exterior, as it develops over a period of around six weeks.

In 1991, the cheese was awarded appellation d'origine contrôlée (AOC) status, which states that the manufacture must follow the following rules:

 The milk's coagulation must be performed by lactic acid and continue for 16 hours.
 The curd must be cut roughly as opposed to being broken.
 After drainage, only dry salt may be used.

Under AOC regulation, only cheese made in listed communes in the Côte-d'Or, Haute-Marne, and Yonne departments may bear the appellation.

See also
 List of cheeses

References

Footnotes

Bibliography

Further reading

External links

 Syndicat de Défense de l'Epoisses
  Fromagerie Berthaut

French cheeses
French products with protected designation of origin
Côte-d'Or
Cow's-milk cheeses
Smear-ripened cheeses
Culture of Burgundy